Reg Gorman (2 August 1932 – 5 August 2021) was an Australian television and film actor, and comedian, he was known best for his role in TV serial  The Sullivans, as Jack Fletcher. and children's series Fergus McPhail as Harry Patterson.

Gorman was also active in radio dramas and theatre and was one of the last active vaudeville performers in Australia.<ref name="Conquest"

Personal life
Reg Gorman, trained with Hayes Gordon and J.C. Williamson Theatre Company, he was married to fellow actor Judith Roberts. The couple had three children: Kate, Karl and Charmaine. They raised their children together while working in the theatre, television and film industries.

Career

Television roles
While having his comedy roots in vaudeville, Gorman began his television career with appearances on the Australian television series Consider Your Verdict in 1964 and again in 1966.  His first recurring star role in a series was the ATN series Mrs. Finnegan in 1970 and 71 as Darby Finnigan in 13 episodes. 

In 1976, he joined the cast of The Sullivans and remained in his role of Jack Fletcher for the series' entire 1976–1983 run.     
  
He played a guest role of four episodes of Prisoner as Bert Gibbs in 1984 and appeared in four episodes of the series The Henderson Kids (1985). In 1985 he guested in four episodes in Neighbours Wally Walters], returning to that series again in 1999 in a different role. 

He starred as Reg Hide in the 1987 series pilot Jackal and Hide alongside Norman Yemm, a co-star from The Sullivans, who co-starred in the pilot as the character of Norm Jackal.    
 
In 1994, he played the role of Mr. Fowler in the Hugh Jackman vehicle Snowy River: The McGregor Saga. In 1997 he held the role of Grandpa in seven episodes of The Wayne Manifesto.

In 2000 through to 2001, he appeared in the series Something in the Air in four episodes as Ken. His most recent episodic role was as Harry Patterson in all 26 episodes of the 2004 comedy series Fergus McPhail.

Film roles
Gorman was also involved in numerous films, beginning in 1968 as Otto in the western drama , released in English as The Drifting Avenger, and up to his most recent 2012 projects, the sci fi film Animals and the short film Like It Was Yesterday.

Gorman was described as being one of the last Australian vaudeville performers.

Death
Gorman died from cancer at The Alfred Hospital in Melbourne, aged 89, on 5 August 2021.

Filmography
Television

 Consider Your Verdict (2 episodes, 1964–1966)
 Contrabandits (2 episodes, 1967)
 Skippy (2 episodes, 1968–1969)
 Riptide (3 episodes, 1969)
 The Rovers (1 episode, 1969)
 Woobinda, Animal Doctor (1 episode, 1969)
 Mrs. Finnegan  (13 episodes, 1970–1971) as Darby Finnegan
 Barrier Reef (1 episode, 1972)
 Division 4 (2 episodes, 1972)
 Boney (1 episode, 1972)
 Spyforce (2 episodes, 1971–1973)
 Rush (1 episode, 1974)
 Homicide (8 episodes, 1965–1976)
 Matlock Police (6 episodes, 1971–1976)
 Power Without Glory (1976)
 The Bluestone Boys (1976)
 The Sullivans (1976–1983) as Jack Fletcher
 Bluey (1 episode, 1976)
 I Can Jump Puddles (1981)
 Carson's Law (1983)
 All the Rivers Run (1983)
 Special Squad (1 episode, 1984)
 Prisoner (4 episodes, 1984) as Bert Gibbs
 The Henderson Kids (4 episodes, 1985) as Kernow
 My Brother Tom (1986)
 A Matter of Convenience (1987)
 Jackal and Hide (1987) as Reg Hide
 The Great Air Race (1990)
 Law of the Land (1 episode, 1994)
 Snowy River: The McGregor Saga (6 episodes, 1994) as Mr. Fowler
 The Wayne Manifesto (7 episodes, 1997) as Grandpa
 State Coroner (1 episode, 1998)
 Neighbours (6 episodes, 1985–1999) as Wally Walters
 My Brother Jack (2001)
 Something in the Air (4 episodes, 2000–2001) as Ken
 Shock Jock (2 episodes, 2001) as Bill
 Blue Heelers (3 episodes, 1995–2001)
 Legacy of the Silver Shadow (1 episode, 2002)
 Fergus McPhail (26 episodes, 2004) as Harry Patterson
 The Pacific (1 episode, 2010)
 Woodley (1 episode, 2012) as Priest
 Problems (4 episodes, 2012) as Ron

Film

  (The Drifting Avenger) (1968) as Otto
 It Takes All Kinds (1969)
 The Intruders (1969)
 Ned Kelly (1970) as Bracken
 Between Wars (1974)
 Alvin Rides Again (1974) as Bookmaker
 Plugg (1975) as Constable Hector
 Inn of the Damned (1975)
 End Play (1975) as TV Reporter
 Dusty (1983) as Watson
 The Bit Part (1987) as Scott
 Slate, Wyn & Me (1987) as Wilkinson
 A Cry in the Dark (1988) as Mr. Whittaker
 A Date with Destiny (1990) as Grooper
 The Big Steal (1990) as Neighbour
 The Alive Tribe (1997) as Barfly
 The Craic (1999) as RSL Manager
 Dalkeith (2002) as Len
 Gusto (2003) as Old Man
 You and Your Stupid Mate (2005) as Stan
 Guy in a Field (2006) as Father
 Five Moments of Infidelity (2006) as David
 Nero's (2009)
 Swings and Roundabouts (2009) as Roy
 Punch Drunk (2010) as Joe Sparro
 The Pawn (2010) as Domenic Chaplan
 Percy (2011) as Percy
 The Cup (2011) as Vern
 Animals (2012) as Richard Patterson
 Like It Was Yesterday (in post-production) as Arthur

References

External links

1932 births
2021 deaths
Australian male comedians
Australian male television actors
Male actors from Sydney